Winterfeld is a village and a former municipality in the district Altmarkkreis Salzwedel, in Saxony-Anhalt, Germany. Since 1 July 2009, it is part of the municipality Apenburg-Winterfeld.

Altmarkkreis Salzwedel